Duke Jordan Trio and Quintet is an album by American pianist Duke Jordan recorded in 1955 and first released on Don Schlitten's Signal label before being acquired by the Savoy label.

Reception

The Allmusic review by Jim Todd stated: "The title of this 1955 Savoy release by pianist Duke Jordan succinctly points to the set's merits and shortcomings. The five trio performances with Art Blakey (drums) and Percy Heath (bass) work well. The five tracks from the same group augmented by Cecil Payne (baritone sax) and Eddie Bert (trombone) don't come up to the mark".

Track listing
All compositions by Duke Jordan, except as indicated
 "Forecast" - 4:50
 "Sultry Eve" - 3:56
 "They Can't Take That Away from Me" (George Gershwin, Ira Gershwin) - 4:34
 "A Night in Tunisia" (Dizzy Gillespie, Frank Paparelli) - 5:09
 "Summertime" (G. Gershwin, I. Gershwin, DuBose Heyward) - 4:24
 "Flight to Jordan" - 4:42
 "Two Lovers" - 3:07
 "Cu-Ba" (Cecil Payne) - 3:31
 "Yesterdays" (Otto Harbach, Jerome Kern) - 5:45
 "Scotch Blues" - 4:33 	

Recorded at the Van Gelder Studio, Hackensack, New Jersey on October 10 (tracks 1-5) and November 20 (tracks 6-10), 1955.

Personnel
Duke Jordan - piano
Eddie Bert - trombone (tracks 6-8 & 10)
Cecil Payne - baritone saxophone (tracks 6-10)
Percy Heath - bass
Art Blakey - drums

References

Savoy Records albums
Duke Jordan albums
1955 albums
Albums produced by Don Schlitten
Albums recorded at Van Gelder Studio